Liam Robert Paro (born 16 April 1996) is an Australian professional boxer.

Early life
Paro was born and raised in Mackay, Queensland  to a family of Italian descent. His first sporting interest came in the form of rugby league where he played for the North Mackay Magpies in the local junior competition. At 13 years of age, he was introduced to the sport of boxing and gave up playing rugby league to focus solely on pursuing a professional career in boxing. In pursuit of higher levels of training, Paro moved to Townsville at 17 years of age before settling in Brisbane as a 20-year-old, where he would regularly train with the likes of future world champion Jeff Horn in the lead up to his monumental victory over legendary Filipino boxer Manny Pacquiao.

Professional boxing career

Paro vs. Álamo 
In his international debut, Paro travelled to Tampa where he was victorious over undefeated Puerto Rican Yomar Álamo via split decision on the Jake Paul vs. Tyron Woodley II undercard.

Professional boxing record

Titles in boxing
Regional Titles
 International Boxing Federation International Super Light Title
 World Boxing Organisation Global Super Light Title

See also
 List of southpaw stance boxers

References

External links
 

1996 births
Living people
Sportspeople from Mackay, Queensland
Australian male boxers
Boxers from Brisbane
Sportsmen from Queensland
Light-welterweight boxers
Southpaw boxers
21st-century Australian people